"Black Steel in the Hour of Chaos" is a song on the American hip hop group Public Enemy's 1988 album, It Takes a Nation of Millions to Hold Us Back. It was released as a single in 1989. The song tells the story of a conscientious objector who makes a prison escape. It is built on a high-pitched piano sample from Isaac Hayes' "Hyperbolicsyllabicsesquedalymistic", from 1969's Hot Buttered Soul.

Song
The vocals are mostly by lead rapper Chuck D, with sidekick Flavor Flav appearing between verses, seemingly speaking to Chuck over the phone. Flavor went to another room and called the studio to achieve this effect.

It features a slower, more melodic beat than other songs on It Takes a Nation of Millions to Hold Us Back. Aside from the aforementioned Hayes sample, the song samples "Little Green Apples" by The Escorts and "Living for the City" by Stevie Wonder.

The lines in the scratch breaks – "Now they got me in a cell" and "Death Row/What a brother knows" – are samples from "Bring the Noise", another song on the same album.

The lyric "anti-nigger machine" became the title of a song on the group's next album, Fear of a Black Planet.

Music video
The music video was filmed in the abandoned cell blocks of the nationally landmarked old Essex County Jail in Newark, New Jersey. The official video was directed by Adam Bernstein. According to Bernstein, Public Enemy wanted Joey Ramone to play a prisoner. Ramone refused, as group member Professor Griff – despite not appearing in the video – had been reported making antisemitic remarks.

Charts

Covers
 Brazilian metal band Sepultura and the rapper Sabotage covered the song.
 Chuck D has performed the song with Asian Dub Foundation and Rage Against the Machine. In 1998, a live version from 1996, featuring Chuck, appeared on Rage Against The Machine's Live & Rare.
 English trip hop musician Tricky released a cover entitled "Black Steel" – with Martina Topley-Bird on vocals, backed by the techno-rock band FTV – on his debut album Maxinquaye (1995). The stripped-down sound of the original is replaced by pounding drums and guitars. Topley-Bird sings the lyrics instead of rapping.

Samples of the song
 "Hyperbolicsyllabicsesquedalymistic" was also used by DJ Muggs for "The Puppet Master", featuring B-Real and Dr. Dre, on the Soul Assassins, Chapter 1 album.
 The same Isaac Hayes sample is used by The Game in the Just Blaze-produced song "Remedy" on the album Doctor's Advocate. Chuck D's line "They got me in a cell" from "Black Steel" is scratched in the hook.
 The beginning of the song is sampled heavily in "Make Some Noise" by "Dougal & Gammer".

Interpolations

 "Officer" by The Pharcyde opens with the lines, "I got a letter from the DMV the other day. I opened and read it, it said they were suckers".
 "Untimely Meditations" by spoken-word artist Saul Williams, from his debut album Amethyst Rock Star, includes the lines, "They wanted me for their army or whatever/Picture me, I swirl like the wind."
 On "Southern Gangsta", from Ludacris's album Theater of the Mind, Rick Ross begins his verse, "I got a letter from the government the other day/I opened and read it, it said we was hustlers".
 Paris' song "What Would You Do", from Sonic Jihad, begins, "I see a message from the government, like every day/I watch it, and listen, and call 'em all suckas/They warnin' me about Osama or whatever/Picture me buyin' this scam, I said never."
 Minnesota rapper Brother Ali opens his song "Letter From the Government" with, "I got a letter from the government the other day, I opened and read it, and burned it, man."  The song appears on Ali's 2007 album, The Undisputed Truth.
 Rapper Talib Kweli's song called "Letter From the Government" has a chorus similar to the opening lines of "Black Steel in the Hour of Chaos". It appears on Kweli and DJ Z-Trip's 2012 mixtape, Attack The Block. The following song, "That's Enough", begins with a sample from "Black Steel in the Hour of Chaos".
 In "Psychopathic Psypher 4", the Psychopathic Records line up (Cold 187um, Twiztid, the Insane Clown Posse, and others) rap about being mislabeled as a gang. Shaggy 2 Dope of the ICP says, "I got a letter from the government the other day, opened it, read it, it said they was bitches!"

Legacy

The title and cover art of writer/director Bayer Mack's 2016 American documentary drama In the Hour of Chaos – which tells the story of the Reverend Martin Luther King, Sr.'s ("Daddy King") rise from an impoverished childhood in the violent backwoods of Georgia to become patriarch of one of the most famous, and tragedy-plagued, families in history – are influenced by Public Enemy's song. The original trailer for the docudrama featured a portion of "Hyperbolicsyllabicsesquedalymistic" by Isaac Hayes. In the Hour of Chaos aired on public television July 25, 2016.

"I don't feel like there's ever been music that's been political in this way that's been so bad-ass," observed musician Joan as Police Woman. "It's so raw, angry [and] extremely intelligent… The music's really cutting and funky, but not in the way you'd hear it now. It's not refined, all the samples are jarring, and the drums are really harsh. It's very punk rock! There's no other rap song that I've learned every word of, and people will be astounded that it was ever made." (Joan As Police Woman covered another Nation of Millions song, "She Watch Channel Zero?!", on her album Cover.)

References

External links

1988 songs
Public Enemy (band) songs
Anti-war songs
Song recordings produced by Rick Rubin
Political rap songs
Songs about prison
Songs written by Chuck D
Songs written by Eric "Vietnam" Sadler
Songs written by Flavor Flav
Songs written by Hank Shocklee
Def Jam Recordings singles
Draft evasion